Selahaddin Eyyubi (Urdu Cyrillic: صلاح الدین ایوبی) is an upcoming Pak-Turk television series produced by Turkey's Akli Film and Pakistan's Ansari and Shah Films. The series is based on the life of Saladin, the founder of Ayyubid dynasty. The television series started production in Summer 2022. The producers asserted that the main target of the series are non-Muslims who are unaware of the Muslim history. The series is being written by numerous Turkish historians and they are also being abetted by Pakistani historians and research writers.

Plot 
The television series focuses on the life of 12th century Muslim ruler Saladin and how he conquered Jerusalem. Furthermore, it focuses on his struggles and battles against the Crusaders and his goal to unite the Muslim territories of Syria, northern Mesopotamia, Palestine and Egypt under his rule.

Cast 
İlhan Şen as Yusuf ibn Ayyub ibn Shadi; Selahaddin Eyyubi is the son of Najm al-Din Ayyub and Sitt al-Mulk Khatun. He is a Sunni Muslim Kurd who established the Ayyubid dynasty and is the first ruler of Egypt and Syria.

Production

Development
On 20 August 2021, the agreement between Emre Konuk, owner of Akli Film Production and Pakistan's Ansari & Shah Films producers on the production of this new series titled Selahaddin Eyyubi was signed in Belgrade. Emre tweeted:
<blockquote>A happy news on a blessed Friday night! Contract signed between Akli Films and Ansari&Shah Films about ‘Sultan Selahaddin Ayyubi’. May this international project, which will be prepared with the cooperation of Turkey and Pakistan, be beneficial to our country and our art world.

On 18 October 2021, the delegation from Turkey landed in Islamabad International Airport to begin auditions for the drama series in Lahore and Karachi.
The delegation visited Faisal Mosque and met with the prime minister to officially announce the Pak-Turk collaboration. They also met with various other government dignitaries. The auditions in Lahore and Karachi took place at Nishat Hotel and DHA respectively. The judges were Berna Kürekci and Ahmet Faruk.

Casting
The series will feature actors from both Turkey and Pakistan. 75% of the show cast will be Turkish including Selahaddin and the rest of 25% cast will be from Pakistan. In this regard, Turkey Akli Film Production announced to scout for talent in Pakistan from October 28 to November 1 of 2021 in Lahore, Karachi, and Islamabad. The series received 10,000 applications in Pakistan from people who wish to have a part in it. Out of more than 6,000 candidates, a total of 60 Pakistani artists got golden tickets in auditions, out of which 18 are from Lahore and 42 from Karachi.

Filming
The TV series will be shot in Turkey and is planned to have three seasons. Each season will have 34 episodes as revealed by Adnan Siddiqui. Production began on January 29, 2022, as producer, Emre Konuk posted an image with the caption, "Selahaddin Eyyubi yakında!" on his Instagram. Almost 240 acres of land is procured in Istanbul where replicas of Jerusalem, Tikrit and various cities of Syria and Egypt will be constructed. The cities constructed were supposed to be inaugurated in Turkey between 15 and 20 March 2022, with Turkish President, Recep Tayyip Erdoğan and Pakistani Prime Minister, Imran Khan as special guests, but that was cancelled, due to a No-confidence motion against Imran Khan, which resulted in his removal from office.

Writing

Selahaddin Eyyubi will use sixteen writers over its three seasons. The historical series is being written by Turkish historians with the assistance of Pakistan's palaeographers and research writers. Kashif Ansari imparted that screenwriters for the series have enlisted the help of Turkish historians, researchers and authors to make it as close to reality as possible. The initial work on the series was completed in September, after that, screen testing began once the casting was done.

Release 
The series started production in summer 2022. There is no current release date for Selahaddin Eyyubi but filming will begin in early 2023. The show is expected to release in the summer 2023.

See  also 
List of Islam-related films

References

External links 
PRESS RELEASE - Ansari Shah Films

Turkish television shows
Pakistani television shows
2021 television seasons